The 2024 UEFA Europa Conference League Final will be the final match of the 2023–24 UEFA Europa Conference League, the third season of Europe's tertiary club football tournament organised by UEFA. It will be played on 29 May 2024.

The winners will qualify to enter the group stage of the 2024–25 UEFA Europa League, unless they have already qualified for the Champions League or Europa League through their league performance (in which case the access list will be rebalanced).

Host selection
On 21 June 2022, UEFA opened the bidding process for the final, which is held in parallel with that of the 2025 final. Interested bidders can bid for either one or both of the finals. The proposed venues must have natural grass and be ranked as a UEFA category four stadium, with a gross capacity of between 30,000 and 50,000 preferred. The bidding timeline is as follows:

21 June 2022: Applications formally invited
31 August 2022: Closing date for registering intention to bid
7 September 2022: Bid requirements made available to bidders
3 November 2022: Submission of preliminary bid dossier
23 February 2023: Submission of final bid dossier
May 2023: Appointment of host

Match

Details
The "home" team (for administrative purposes) will be determined by an additional draw to be held after the quarter-final and semi-final draws.

See also
2024 UEFA Champions League Final
2024 UEFA Europa League Final
2024 UEFA Women's Champions League Final

Notes

References

External links

2024
Final
Scheduled association football competitions
May 2024 sports events in Europe